Crosseola concinna is a species of small sea snail or micromollusc, a marine gastropod mollusc in the family Conradiidae.

Description
The minute, narrowly umbilicate, rather solid shell has a turbinate shape. It is white and semipellucid. The spire is raised, the suture is distinct. The five whorls are rounded, the first three transversely ribbed and longitudinally striated. The remainder are transversely punctate-striate. The umbilicus is bordered by a rounded callus. The circular aperture has a channelled angular projection in front. The outer lip is simple, the margin acute.

Distribution
This marine species is endemic to Australia. It occurs in the sublittoral zone off New South Wales, South Australia, Tasmania and Victoria

References

 Angas, G.F. 1867. On a new genus and some new species of marine Mollusca from Port Jackson, New South Wales. Proceedings of the Zoological Society of London 1867: 908-935, pl. 44
 May, W.L. 1916. Additions to the Tasmanian Mollusca, with descriptions of new species. Papers and Proceedings of the Royal Society of Tasmania 1915: 75-99
 Iredale, T. & McMichael, D.F. 1962. A reference list of the marine Mollusca of New South Wales. Memoirs of the Australian Museum 11: 1-109
 Cotton, B.C. 1959. South Australian Mollusca. Archaeogastropoda. Handbook of the Flora and Fauna of South Australia. Adelaide : South Australian Government Printer 449 pp

External links
 World Register of Marine Species
 

concinna
Gastropods described in 1867